In the stochastic calculus, Tanaka's formula for the Brownian motion states that

where Bt is the standard Brownian motion, sgn denotes the sign function

and Lt is its local time at 0 (the local time spent by B at 0 before time t) given by the L2-limit

One can also extend the formula to semimartingales.

Properties
Tanaka's formula is the explicit Doob–Meyer decomposition of the submartingale |Bt| into the martingale part (the integral on the right-hand side, which is a Brownian motion), and a continuous increasing process (local time).

Outline of proof 
The function |x| is not C2 in x at x = 0, so we cannot apply Itō's formula directly. But if we approximate it near zero (i.e. in [−ε, ε]) by parabolas

and use Itō's formula, we can then take the limit as ε → 0, leading to Tanaka's formula.

References 

  (Example 5.3.2)
 

Equations
Martingale theory
Probability theorems
Stochastic calculus